Minakshi Datta (Bengali: মীনাক্ষী দত্ত) is a Bengali educationist, writer, actor, translator and anthologist.  An educator all her life, she is a widely recognized influence in the Kolkata and the New York literary and cultural circles. Married to fellow Bengali writer Jyotirmoy Datta, she is the mother of two children, Mallinath Datta, who was an IT professional, dramatist and filmmaker, and Kankabati Datta, who is an editor and a writer.
Minakshi and Jyotirmoy Datta divide their time between Kolkata, India and Cherry Hill, New Jersey, USA.She also acted in a Bengali movie Banojyotsna directed by Dinen Gupta.

Biography 
Minakshi Datta was born on 1 October 1935 in Kolkata to eminent parents.  Her father was Buddhadeb Bosu, one of the most important Bengali literary figures after Rabindranath Tagore.  Her mother was the celebrated novelist and singer Pratibha Basu, many of whose novels have been bestsellers and have been made into successful movies.
Minakshi Datta grew up in what was then the cradle of modernism in Bengal, ‘Kavita Bhavan’ at 202 Rashbehari Avenue, Kolkata.  She graduated from Presidency College, Kolkata, and did her master's degree at the University of Calcutta.  Since then, her active participations in various streams of literature   have continued in parallel with her professional life as an educator, spanning two countries - India and the USA.

Literary activities 
Minakshi Datta has authored fifteen books.  This includes an anthology of Western love stories, titled ‘Bideshini’ (Bengali for ‘woman of other lands’), published in 1960.  This book has been reprinted multiple times. It introduced several Western masters of romantic fiction to the Bengali readers.  Her three-volume authoritative anthology of the ‘Best of Kavita’ (poetry magazine edited by her father Buddhadeb Bosu) is regarded by many as the best introduction to modern Bengali poetry.  Her memoir of some of the literary figures that she knew in her youth and childhood, ‘Album theke koyekjon’ (Bengali for ‘profiles from my album’) brings to life one of the most colorful periods of Bengali literature.  She is a featured writer of a column on the Sunday edition of a leading daily Kolkata newspaper ‘Aajkaal.’ 
Datta's autobiographical sketches of Kavita Bhavan, ‘Buddhodeb Bosu O Tanr Sarorswat Goshthi’ (Bengali for ‘Buddhadeva Bose and his Literary Circle’) and ‘Smritite Chithite  Buddhodeb Bosu’ (Bengali for ‘Reminiscences and Letters of Buddhadeva Bose’) portray the age of artistic excitement in Kolkata of the 1950s and 1960s.
Datta's original works includes two books of short stories.  Her translations include ‘Kalki’ by Dr. Radhakrishnan, 'Dr. Zhivago’ by Boris Pasternak, journals of Fanny Parkes, and the autobiography of the ballet dancer Le Cunxin.

Literary and cultural organizations 
In USA, Datta has been the President of 'Tagore Society of New York.'  She was the founder of the New Jersey-based drama group ‘Aastha.’

Biographical book 
In 2017, a collection of essays on Minakshi Datta and Jyotirmoy Datta was published in the Kolkata Book Fair, titled "A Liber Amicorum - Jyotirmoy Datta o Minakshi Datta, Bondhuder Lekhay."  The book has articles in Bengali and English.

Acting 
Datta has acted in two Bengali feature films – Dinen Gupta's ‘Bonjyotsna’ and Buddhadev Dasgupta's ‘Continent of Love.’ She has also acted in several plays including Rabindranath Tagore's ‘Shesh raksha,’ ‘Chirakumar sabha,’ ‘Dalia’ and ‘Grihaprabesh.’

References 
 
 
 
 

1935 births
Scholars from Kolkata
Living people
People from Cherry Hill, New Jersey